Chefography is a television series biography of Food Network personalities. Chefography was created by Baron Corso de Palenzuela. While the name implies that the program features biographies of chefs, it in fact includes both chef and non-chef Food Network personalities.

The series airs on Food Network in the United States and Food Network Canada in Canada.

Biographies broadcast
Mario Batali
Laura Calder
Paula Deen
Giada De Laurentiis
Bobby Flay
Tyler Florence
Ina Garten
Emeril Lagasse
Nigella Lawson
Alexandra Guarnaschelli
Sandra Lee
Rachael Ray

The following Chefographies premiered Monday, April, 7th through Thursday, April 10, 2008:
Julia Child (April 7)
Duff Goldman (April 10)
Wolfgang Puck (April 8)
Food Network (April 9)

The Following Chefographies premiered Saturday, August 15, 2009:
The Neelys (Pat and Gina Neely)
Guy Fieri

An episode about Robert Irvine was put into production but was pulled from the schedule before the completion of the episode due to controversy surrounding Irvine.

External links
Food Network show's page

Food Network original programming
2005 American television series debuts
2000s American cooking television series
2010s American cooking television series